The 1972 US Open was a tennis tournament that took place on the outdoor grass courts at the West Side Tennis Club in Forest Hills, Queens, in New York City, USA. The tournament ran from 28 August until 10 September. It was the 92nd staging of the US Open, and the fourth Grand Slam tennis event of 1972.

Finals

Men's singles

 Ilie Năstase defeated  Arthur Ashe, 3–6, 6–3, 6–7(1–5), 6–4, 6–3 
It was Năstase's 1st career Grand Slam title, and his 1st (and only) US Open title.

Women's singles

 Billie Jean King defeated  Kerry Melville, 6–3, 7–5 
It was King's 9th career Grand Slam title, her 5th during the Open Era, and her 3rd US Open title.

Men's doubles

 Cliff Drysdale /  Roger Taylor defeated  Owen Davidson /  John Newcombe, 6–4, 7–6, 6–3

Women's doubles

 Françoise Dürr /  Betty Stöve defeated  Margaret Court /  Virginia Wade, 6–3, 1–6, 6–3

Mixed doubles

 Margaret Court /  Marty Riessen defeated  Rosemary Casals /  Ilie Năstase, 6–3, 7–5

Top 10 seeds

Men's singles

References

External links
Official US Open website

 
 

 
Us Open
US Open
1972
US Open
US Open
1972 in sports in New York City